Íñigo Méndez de Vigo y Montojo, 9th Baron of Claret (born 21 January 1956) is a Spanish aristocrat and politician. He served as Minister of Education, Culture and Sport between 26 June 2015 and 1 June 2018, when a vote of no-confidence against Mariano Rajoy ousted the government. He was also the Spokesperson of the Government from 4 November 2016 until his departure on 1 June 2018.

Childhood and education

Méndez de Vigo was born on 21 January 1956 in Tetuan, then part of the Spanish Protectorate of Morocco, where his father (descendant of the Minister of War Santiago Méndez de Vigo and his wife Ana Isabel Osorio y Zayas, Countess suo jure of Santa Cruz de los Manueles) was serving as a lieutenant in the infantry. He is descended, amongst others, from the Marquesses of Cubas, the Dukes of Riánsares and Queen mother of Spain Maria Christina of the Two Sicilies (María Cristina de Borbón), and via his maternal grandmother, the novelist Carmen de Icaza, he succeeded, on 8 January 1981, to her title as 9th Baron de Claret. Íñigo Méndez de Vigo y Montojo is a fourth cousin once removed of Felipe VI through common descent from Queen Maria Cristina, Consort and later Regent of Spain.

Méndez de Vigo has a brother, Pedro, an army officer, and two sisters, Beatriz and Valeria, one who is the secretary general of the National Intelligence Center, and the other for a non-governmental organisation.

He completed his schooling at the German School in Madrid, as well as studying French language at the Académie française and learning English at the British Institute School. He graduated in law from the Universidad Complutense de Madrid in 1978.

Following the completion of his military service with the rank of lieutenant and after passing the public exams, he became legal advisor to the Cortes Generales in 1981.

He is married to María Pérez de Herrasti y Urquijo, since 8 January 2020 Marchioness of Albayda (with Grandeeship of Spain) and Marchioness of la Conquista.

Career

Political career
In 1982, at the age of 26, Méndez de Vigo was appointed director of interparliamentary relations for the Cortes Generales. In 1984 he accepted the position of special advisor to then-secretary general of the Council of Europe, Marcelino Oreja.

He joined the People's Party at its founding Conference in 1989, and stood unsuccessfully in that year as one of its candidates at the European election.

In October 1992 he was elected a Member of the European Parliament, a position he held until December 2011. He also served as a member of the People's Party's National Steering Committee.

Méndez de Vigo served as the European People's Party co-ordinator on the Committee on Constitutional Affairs from 1994 and on its Committee on Economic and Monetary Affairs (2009–2011), as well as:

 Chairman of the EP Delegation to the Convention drafting the Charter of Fundamental Rights (1999–2000);
 Chairman of the EP Delegation to the European Convention (2003–04);
 EP representative to the IGC (2004);
 Parliament's rapporteur (with Richard Corbett MEP) on the Treaty establishing a European Constitution (2004);
 Parliament's rapporteur (with Richard Corbett MEP) on the Treaty of Lisbon.

Between 2006 and 2007, Méndez de Vigo served as member of the Amato Group, a group of high-level European politicians unofficially working on rewriting the Treaty establishing a Constitution for Europe into what became known as the Treaty of Lisbon following its rejection by French and Dutch voters. In 2009 he was appointed president of the College of Europe.

After his appointment to the Spanish Government in December 2011 by Mariano Rajoy Brey, Méndez de Vigo served as Secretary of State for the European Union. In June 2015 he was appointed Minister of Education, Culture and Sport in replacement of José Ignacio Wert. In November 2016, in the Second Rajoy Government, he was also appointed Spokesperson of the Government.

Academic career
 Lecturer in constitutional law (UCM, 1981–1984)
 Lecturer in community law (1989–1991)
 Jean Monnet Chair in European Institutions (UCM, 1999–2004)
 Honorary Jean Monnet Chair (2004)

Other activities
 Elcano Royal Institute for International and Strategic Studies, member of the board of trustees
 European Council on Foreign Relations (ECFR), member
 Thyssen-Bornemisza Museum, chairman of the board of trustees
 Museo Picasso Málaga, honorary member of the board of trustees
 Universal Forum of Cultures, honorary member of the board of trustees

Publications
Méndez de Vigo has written numerous books and articles on Europe:

 Una Reforma Fiscal para España, with José Manuel García-Margallo (Ed. Lid, 1996)
 Financiación de las Comunidades Autónomas y Corresponsabilidad Fiscal, with José Manuel García-Margallo and Vicente Martínez-Pujalte (Fundación Bancaixa, 1996)
 La Apuesta Europea: de la moneda a la Unión Política, with José Manuel García-Margallo (Ed. Política Exterior, 1998)
 Europa paso a paso (2002)
 El rompecabezas. Así redactamos la Constitución europea (Ed. Biblioteca Nueva and Real Instituto Elcano, 2005)
 ¿Por qué una Constitución para Europa? 25 respuestas, with Marcelino Oreja and Juan Antonio Carrillo Salcedo (Ed. Real Academia de Ciencias Morales y Políticas, 2005)
 Alegato por Europa (Ed. Biblioteca nueva, 2006)
 Coordinator: ¿Qué fue de la Constitución europea? (Ed. Planeta, 2007)
 Editor: Liber Amicorum Marcelino Oreja Aguirre (Ed. Cinterco, 2010)

Méndez de Vigo also writes for ABC, and is an online contributor for El Economista.

Titles, Honours and awards

Titles
 9th Baron of Claret
Consort of the Marchioness of Albayda (since 2020)
Consort of the Marchioness of la Conquista (since 2020)

Honours
 2001:  Grand Cross of the Order of Civil Merit of Spain
 2008:  Grand Officer of the Order of the Star of Italian Solidarity
 2010:  Grand Cross of the Order of Merit of the Federal Republic of Germany
 2011:  Knight of the Legion of Honour of the French Republic
 2011:  Medal of the Spanish Order of Constitutional Merit

Awards
 1999: Salvador de Madariaga European Journalism Prize
 2001: Silver Medal of the Royal Institute of European Studies
 2002: Medal of Honour of the Sociedad General de Autores y Editores
 2002: Gold Medal of the Foundation of European Merit
 2003: Prize to the MEP of the year by the Association of Parliamentary Journalists
 2007: Gold Medal of the Committees of Action for European Union
 2009: Prix Capalbio – European Special Award

References

External links

1956 births
Living people
People from Tétouan
20th-century Spanish nobility
Government ministers of Spain
People's Party (Spain) MEPs
MEPs for Spain 1989–1994
MEPs for Spain 1994–1999
MEPs for Spain 1999–2004
MEPs for Spain 2004–2009
MEPs for Spain 2009–2014
Order of Civil Merit members
Commanders Crosses of the Order of Merit of the Federal Republic of Germany
Chevaliers of the Légion d'honneur
Recipients of the Order of Constitutional Merit
Culture ministers of Spain
Members of the 12th Congress of Deputies (Spain)
Secretaries of State for the European Union